Magdaléna Rybáriková is the defending champion, but she lost in the first round to the American qualifier Jamie Hampton.

Sofia Arvidsson won the title by defeating Marina Erakovic 6–3, 6–4 in the final. This was Arvidsson's second WTA title, with her first title won at the same event six years ago.

Seeds

Draw

Finals

Top half

Bottom half

Qualifying

Seeds

Qualifiers

Draw

First qualifier

Second qualifier

Third qualifier

Fourth qualifier

References
 Main Draw
 Qualifying Draw

Cellular South Cup - Singles
Singles